Gnathorhiza is an extinct genus of prehistoric lobe-finned fish (lungfish) which lived during the Permian period and Early Triassic epoch.

References

Prehistoric lungfish genera
Permian bony fish
Permian fish of North America
Fossils of Poland